Curtis Jobling (born 14 February 1972) is a British illustrator, animator and author, born in Blackpool, England but lives in Warrington.

He was the original production designer of the stop-motion puppet version of children's TV hit Bob the Builder, where he visualised all of that programme's characters, props and sets. Jobling is also an author and illustrator of children's books, including Frankenstein's Cat, a tale about a muddled-up feline. The book was adapted into an animated series, the first of which was aired on CBBC and BBC1 in the UK.  Frankenstein's Cat, voiced by British comedian Joe Pasquale, has also aired in France, Australia and South America.

Curtis's pre-school show, Raa Raa the Noisy Lion, about a noisy lion cub and his Jingly Jangly Jungle friends was produced by Chapman Entertainment and McKinnon and Saunders, and first aired on the BBC's CBeebies channel in Spring 2011. Narrated by Lorraine Kelly, the show aimed to support pre-school language development through "reading rhyming and repetition".

In 2010, Curtis signed a two-book deal with Puffin for his young adult series of fantasy horror entitled Wereworld.  The first novel, Rise of The Wolf, was released in January 2011 in the UK, and short-listed for the Waterstone's Children's Book Prize 2011. The US edition was released in Fall 2011. The second book, Rage of Lions was released Summer 2011, with books 3 & 4 released in 2012, and books 5 & 6 released in the summer and fall of 2013 respectively.
In 2022, Netflix announced that an animated adaption of the Wereworld books was in development with Lime Pictures, with Jobling named as part of the production team.  

He is a fan of the rugby team Warrington Wolves (nickname Wire).

Bibliography

Picturebooks
Frankenstein's Cat
The Skeleton in the Closet (with Alice Schertle) (HarperCollins Children's Books, 2003) 
My Daddy: My Daddy is the Best in the Universe (HarperCollins, 2005) 
Cheeky Monkey (Oxford University Press, 2006) 
Dinosaurs After Dark (with Jonathan Emmett) (HarperCollins Children's Books, 2006) 
Old Macdonald had a Zoo (Egmont, 2014) 
The Sheep Won't Sleep (Egmont 2015)

The Wereworld Series
Wereworld: Rise of the Wolf (Puffin, 2010) 
Wereworld: Rage Of Lions (Puffin, 2011) 
Wereworld: Shadow of the Hawk (Puffin, 2012) 
Wereworld: Nest of Serpents (Puffin, 2012) 
Wereworld: Storm of Sharks (Puffin,2013) 
Wereworld: War of the Werelords (Puffin,2013)

Haunt
Haunt (Simon and Schuster Children's books, 2014)  
Haunt 2: Dead Wrong (Simon and Schuster UK, 2014)

Max Helsing: Monster Hunter Series
Max Helsing and the 13th curse (Viking Books, 2015) 
Max Helsing and the Beast of Bone Creek (Viking Books, 2016)

Other works
A New Hero (World of Warriors book 1) (Puffin, 2015)

References

External links

Curtis Jobling's blog

British illustrators
People from Blackpool
1972 births
Living people
English horror writers